Salma Ali Saif Bin Hareb (born 1965) is an Emirati business executive. She was the chief executive officer of Jebel Ali Free Zone and of Economic Zones World from 2005 to 2015. In 2008, Hareb was ranked number one in Forbes Arabia's list of the 50 most powerful Arab businesswomen of 2008.  She is the first woman in the Middle East and North Africa to be appointed head of an economic free zone. She has been serving as independent non-executive director of NMC Health PLC since 2014.

In 2014, Forbes ranked her as the third most powerful Arab woman.

Since 2005, Hareb served as CEO of Economic Zones World Corp until 2015 succeeded by Mohammed Al Muallem.

References

Living people
Emirati businesspeople
Emirati women in business
Emirati chief executives
1965 births